Exiled to Shanghai is a 1937 American comedy film directed by Nick Grinde and Armand Schaefer and starring Wallace Ford, June Travis, and Dean Jagger.

Production
Despite its exotic-sounding title, none of the film is actually set in Shanghai. The film's sets were designed by art director John Victor Mackay.

Cast
 Wallace Ford as Ted Young 
 June Travis as Nancy Jones 
 Dean Jagger as Charlie Sears  
 William Bakewell as Andrew  
 Arthur Lake as Bud  
 Jonathan Hale as J.B. Willet  
 William Harrigan as Grant Powell  
 Sarah Padden as Aunt Jane  
 Syd Saylor as Maloney  
 Charles Trowbridge as Walters  
 Johnny Arthur as Poppolas  
 Maurice Cass as Hotel Manager  
 Minerva Urecal as Claire  
 Sally Payne as Mabel

References

Bibliography
 Dooley, Roger. From Scarface to Scarlett: American Films in the 1930s. Harcourt Brace Jovanovich, 1984.

External links
 

1937 films
1937 comedy films
1930s English-language films
American comedy films
Republic Pictures films
American black-and-white films
Films directed by Armand Schaefer
Films directed by Nick Grinde
1930s American films